is a Japanese film producer. He was nominated in 1956 for the Academy Award for Best Foreign Language Film for producing Kon Ichikawa's The Burmese Harp.  His other film production credits include Ichikawa's Ghost Story of Youth (1955) and The Heart (1955), Seijun Suzuki's The Bastard (1963), Our Blood Will Not Forgive (1964) and Tattooed Life (1965), and Shohei Imamura's Unholy Desire (1965).  He also served as associate producer for part of Tora! Tora! Tora! (1970).

External links

References

Japanese film producers
Possibly living people
Year of birth missing
Place of birth missing